Die Chinesische Mauer is Michael Cretu's third solo album, released in 1985. The literal English translation of the title is "The Chinese Wall", or as it is better known, "The Great Wall of China". Like his previous album Legionäre, this had German lyrics, was sung by Michael and was co-produced by Armand Volker. The album was separately with English lyrics and a different track listing under the name "The Invisible Man". Several of the tracks on "The Invisible Man" were edited slightly and therefore last for a different length than the German versions on Die Chinesische Mauer and sides 1 and 2 were swapped for a more commercial track-listing. The song Samurai was released as a single and became a hit in Europe (#1 Greece, #2 Switzerland, #4 Italy, #4 Sweden, #12 Germany), but its success was mostly with the English version. In 1986, after the success of the single "Gambit", the English version of the album was re-released on LP to feature this song, but with the track "Carte Blanche" removed due to groove space. This edition featured a whole new cover and package design by Mike Schmidt at Ink Studios, whom at this point had designed nearly all of the artwork and design for Cretu and related productions. The album was recorded entirely at Cretu's then-studio "Data Alpha Studio" alongside recording The Long Play by Sandra. The studio resided in the basement of Sandra and Cretu's home.

Die Chinesische Mauer (German Edition)
 "Intro" - 2:28
 "Mikado" - 3:17
 "Coda" - 0:59
 "Amazonen" - 5:19
 "Die Chinesische Mauer" - 5:01
 "Samurai" - 5:22
 "Carte Blanche" - 3:56
 "Schwarzer Engel" - 5:18
 "Zinnsoldat" - 3:24

The Invisible Man (English Edition)
 "Samurai (Did You Ever Dream)" - 5:13
 "Carte Blanche (Ride on with the Breeze)" - 3:24
 "Silver Water" - 4:42
 "Your Favorite Toy" - 3:26
 "Intro" (Cretu, Cretu) - 2:27
 "Mikado" (Cretu, Cretu) - 3:14
 "Coda" (Cretu, Cretu) - 0:59
 "Heavy Traffic" - 4:57
 "The Invisible Man" - 5:01

The Invisible Man (1986 LP Reissue)
 "Gambit" - 4:35
 "Saumurai (Did You Ever Dream)" - 5:13
 "Silver Water" - 4:40
 "Your Favorite Toy" - 3:24
 "Intro" - 2:28
 "Mikado" - 3:13
 "Coda" - 0:59
 "Heavy Traffic" - 4:54
 "The Invisible Man" - 5:01

Singles Released
Samurai (German & English 7"/12") 1985
Carte Blanche (German 7") 1985
Schwarzer Engel (German 7"/12") 1984
Silver Water (English 7"/12") 1985
Die Chinesische Mauer (German 7"/12") 1985
Gambit (English 7"/12") 1986

Personnel 

Mats Bjorklund – guitar
Peter Cornelius – guitar
Curt Cress – percussion, drums
Michael Crétu – keyboards, vocals, producer, electric drums, drum programming
Christian Felke – saxophone
Mike Schmidt – artwork
Armand Volker – producer

Charts

References

External links 

 

1985 albums
Michael Cretu albums
Virgin Records albums